Agios Dimitrios (Greek: Άγιος Δημήτριος) is a former municipality in the Ioannina regional unit, Epirus, Greece. Since the 2011 local government reform it is part of the municipality Dodoni, of which it is a municipal unit. Population 4,566 (2011), its area is 231.473 km². The seat of the municipality was in Theriakisi.  The largest village is Kato Mousiotitsa which has a school, gymnasium and lyceum. The municipal unit covers the northwestern part of the Xerovouni mountains.

Subdivisions
The municipal unit Agios Dimitrios is subdivided into the following communities (constituent villages in brackets):
Agia Triada
Avgo
Episkopiko
Kopani
Kouklesi (Kouklesi, Potamia)
Kryfovo (Kryfovo, Kato Kryfovo)
Melia (Melia, Agia Paraskevi, Lagkiotissa)
Mousiotitsa (Nea Mousiotitsa, Ano Mousiotitsa, Kato Mousiotitsa, Mesoura)
Myrodafni
Perdika (Perdika, Vasaiika)
Pesta
Ravenia
Serviana (Serviana, Molyvadia, Taxiarchis)
Sklivani (Sklivani, Agios Georgios, Agios Christoforos, Koulouraiika, Profitis Ilias, Rachi, Stavros, Chora)
Terovo (Terovo, Rapsaioi, Chani Terovou)
Theriakisi (Theriakisi, Agia Kyriaki, Eisodia Theotokou, Kanneta)
Varlaam
Vouliasta

Population

External links
Agios Dimitrios on GTP Travel Pages

References

Populated places in Ioannina (regional unit)